is a Japanese former gymnast who competed in the 1972 Summer Olympics.

References

1948 births
Living people
Japanese male artistic gymnasts
Olympic gymnasts of Japan
Gymnasts at the 1972 Summer Olympics
Olympic gold medalists for Japan
Olympic medalists in gymnastics
Asian Games medalists in gymnastics
Gymnasts at the 1978 Asian Games
Asian Games silver medalists for Japan
Asian Games bronze medalists for Japan
Medalists at the 1978 Asian Games
Medalists at the 1972 Summer Olympics
Universiade medalists in gymnastics
Universiade gold medalists for Japan
Medalists at the 1970 Summer Universiade
20th-century Japanese people
21st-century Japanese people